Rest Inside the Flames is the third album by American metalcore band 36 Crazyfists. It was released in Australia on June 10, 2006 and in Europe and the UK on June 12, 2006. The album was released in the US on November 7 via the band's new North American label, DRT Entertainment. Almost two months prior to the album's official release date of June 12, the album was leaked and began appearing on P2P sites. 

The album features guest vocals by ex-Killswitch Engage frontman Howard Jones on the track "Elysium", as well as Jonah Jenkins (vocalist of Milligram and ex-vocalist of Only Living Witness) on the track "We Cannot Deny". Crazyfists frontman Lindow was pleased with Jenkins appearance on the album and said, in an interview, "Only Living Witness was one of our favorite bands growing up, so we really wanted him to be on the record. Over the years, I made friends with him online, which is a little weird. But he lives in Boston so he came down to New Jersey when we were recording, and that was awesome." 

The first single released from the album was "I'll Go Until My Heart Stops".

Track listing

Personnel
Brock Lindow – vocals
Mick Whitney – bass
Thomas Noonan – drums
Steve Holt – guitar, background vocals, co-producer
Tom Gomes – drums on "We Cannot Deny"
Howard Jones – guest vocals on "Elysium"
Jonah Jenkins – guest vocals on "We Cannot Deny"

Production
Jeff Chenault – creative director
Monte Conner – A&R
Erin Farley – assistant engineer
Larry Mazer – management
Daragh McDonagh – photography
Andy Sneap – mastering, mixing
Arun Venkatesh – assistant engineer
Sal Villanueva – producer, engineer

Charts

References

36 Crazyfists albums
2006 albums
Roadrunner Records albums
DRT Entertainment albums
Albums produced by Sal Villanueva